Michael Francis Stephens (born April 3, 1989) is an American former professional soccer player.

Career

College and Amateur
Stephens grew up in Naperville, Illinois, attended Edison Academic Center, and played four years of college soccer at UCLA. He was honored as UCLA's Rookie of the Year in 2006, while also being selected to the Top Drawer Soccer All-Freshman first team and to Soccer America's All-Freshman second team, playing in all 24 games in his rookie season.

He was named to the Soccer America MVP second-team in 2008, and became only the third player in Bruin history to earn Pac-10 Player of the Year honors. As a senior, he was named to the All-Pac-10 First-team and was a NSCAA All-Far West second-team honoree. He finished his UCLA career with 81 appearances, 11 goals and 20 assists.

During his college years Stephens also played two seasons with Chicago Fire Premier in the USL Premier Development League.

Professional
Stephens was drafted in the first round (16th overall) of the 2010 MLS SuperDraft by Los Angeles Galaxy.  He made his professional debut on March 27, 2010, in Galaxy's opening game of the 2010 MLS season against New England Revolution.

In March 2014, Stephens signed a two-year contract with Norwegian Tippeligaen side Stabæk. After one season with Stabæk, Stephens returned to MLS on 9 December 2014, signing with Chicago Fire. After the end of 2016 season, Fire did not exercise his contract option and he became a free agent.

After his release from Chicago, Stephens joined North American Soccer League side San Francisco Deltas on January 6, 2017.

International
Stephens was a member of U.S. squad at the 2009 FIFA U-20 World Cup, having previously scored a goal in consecutive games against Costa Rica with the Under-20s in May. He was the US's starting forward in three games at the 2007 Pan American Games, and featured for the Under-18 National Team in 2006, scoring one goal with three assists. Previously, he had been a member of the U-17 National Team Residency Program from 2004–06, and played with the U-15 and U-16 National Teams.

Career statistics

Honors

Los Angeles Galaxy
MLS Cup (2): 2011, 2012
Major League Soccer Supporters' Shield (2): 2010, 2011
Major League Soccer Western Conference Championship (2): 2011, 2012

San Francisco Deltas
NASL Soccer Bowl (1): 2017

References

External links

 
 UCLA bio

1989 births
Living people
American soccer players
American expatriate soccer players
UCLA Bruins men's soccer players
Chicago Fire U-23 players
LA Galaxy players
Stabæk Fotball players
Chicago Fire FC players
San Francisco Deltas players
Expatriate footballers in Norway
USL League Two players
Major League Soccer players
Eliteserien players
North American Soccer League players
People from Hinsdale, Illinois
LA Galaxy draft picks
Footballers at the 2007 Pan American Games
United States men's youth international soccer players
United States men's under-20 international soccer players
United States men's under-23 international soccer players
Association football midfielders
Pan American Games competitors for the United States